{{DISPLAYTITLE:C20H29N3O2}}
The molecular formula C20H29N3O2 (molar mass: 343.46 g/mol, exact mass: 343.2260 u) may refer to:

 ADBICA (ADB-PICA)
 Cinchocaine

Molecular formulas